The Black Mountain Archeological District is a region of the Bighorn Basin near Shell, Wyoming that contains archeological sites associated with chert deposits used in making tools and weapons. Covering , the area was occupied from about 11,500 years ago in the Paleoindian Period to the Late Prehistoric Period of 1500 to 400 years ago. The sites have not yielded more recent artifacts.  The area contains six rock shelters, two campsites at canyon bottoms and one interfluve campsite, as well as the Black Mountain and East Spring Creek chert quarries. The local chert comes from the Phosphoria Formation, and is red in color. The district was placed on the National Register of Historic Places on July 2, 1987.

References

External links
 Black Mountain Archeological District at the Wyoming State Historic Preservation Office

National Register of Historic Places in Big Horn County, Wyoming
Archaeological sites on the National Register of Historic Places in Wyoming
Rock shelters in the United States